The Rural Municipality of Brokenhead is a rural municipality (RM) in the Canadian province of Manitoba.

The Town of Beausejour, a separate urban municipality, lies within the borders of Brokenhead.

History
The RM was incorporated on 15 November 1900. 

The RM had a population of 4,635 in the 2011 Census, an increase of 17.6% over its population of 3,940 in the 2006 Census. The RM is adjacent on its western and southern sides to, but not a part of, the Census Metropolitan Area of Winnipeg.

Communities
The Town of Beausejour is a separate urban municipality but shares some of administrative services with the RM of Brokenhead.
Local urban districts
Tyndall–Garson (includes the neighbouring communities of Tyndall and Garson)
Hamlets
Brokenhead
Cloverleaf
Cromwell
Green Bay
Hazelglen
Ladywood
Lydiatt
St. Ouens

Demographics 

Notable residents 
Clarence Baker — New Democratic Party of Manitoba MLA.
Fred Klym — Progressive Conservative Party of Manitoba MLA.
John Sinnott — MP in the House of Commons of Canada, served as reeve of Brokenhead from 1936 to 1943 and 1950 to 1951.
Edward Schreyer — Governor General of Canada from January 22, 1979 to May 14, 1984

References

External links

 Official website

Rural municipalities in Manitoba